The Friendly Societies Act 1875 was an Act of the Parliament of the United Kingdom passed by Benjamin Disraeli's Conservative government following the publication of the Royal Commission on Friendly Societies' Final Report.

It was one of the Friendly Societies Acts 1875 to 1895

The Act encouraged friendly societies to register with the Registrar of Friendly Societies by granting them the legal right to own land and property in the name of their trustees and the ability to take out legal proceedings in return for registration. Registered societies were subject to regulation, for example they were required to submit quinquennial returns to the Registrar which gave details of their financial affairs and in-force business which could be used by the Registrar to evaluate their assets against their liabilities under life assurance, annuity and sickness business.

Friendly societies paid de facto old-age pensions in the form of sickness benefit and the Act defined "old age" as 50 and above, and although a court ruling claimed that "natural decay" was not "sickness" the majority of friendly societies did not accept this ruling as they were in competition with each other and so therefore wanted to continue paying pensions to attract new members.

The Act allowed friendly societies considerable self-management "but insured the adoption of sound rules, effective audit, and rates of payment sufficient to maintain solvency. It established the friendly societies, and with them the people's savings on a satisfactory basis".

In 1889 Mr Braxton Hicks, the London coroner, wrote a letter to the Times about the dangers of child life insurance. He wrote that the insurances act as a temptation to the parents to neglect them, or feed them with improper food, and sometimes even to kill them, as in the excessively numerous cases of "over-laying" or suffocating in bed.

References
William Andrews Holdsworth. The Friendly Societies Act, 1875. With Explanatory Introduction and Notes; an Appendix containing the Clauses of other Acts affecting Friendly Societies and an Index. George Routledge and Sons. The Broadway, Ludgate, London. 1875. Google Books.

United Kingdom Acts of Parliament 1875
1875 in British law
Friendly societies of the United Kingdom